Kannarum Pothi Pothi is a 1985 Indian Malayalam film,  directed by Hassan and produced by Subramaniyam. The film stars Madhu, Srividya, Rasheed Ummer and Sathaar in the lead roles. The film has musical score by A. T. Ummer.

Cast 
Madhu as Public Prosecutor Karunakaran
Srividya as Bhavani
Rasheed Ummer as Suresh
Sathaar as Chandran
Ashwini as Lakshmi
Bheeman Raghu as Vasu
Paravoor Bharathan as Murali

Soundtrack 
The music was composed by A. T. Ummer and the lyrics were written by P. Bhaskaran.

References

External links 
 

1985 films
1980s Malayalam-language films